Siegerswoude is a village in the municipality of Opsterland in eastern Friesland, the Netherlands. It had a population of around 810 in January 2017.

The village was first mentioned in 1315 as Sigerwolde, and means "the woods of Sieger (person)". Siegerwoude developed as three little hamlets in a peat excavation area. The Dutch Reformed church dated from 1910, but burnt down in 1941. In 1949, it was rebuilt.

Siegerwoude was home to 210 people in 1840.

Gallery

References

External links

Populated places in Friesland
Geography of Opsterland